Rasa Drazdauskaitė (born 20 March 1981 in Šiauliai) is a Lithuanian long-distance runner. She represented her country at the 2008 Olympics in Beijing, finishing 37th in the marathon.  She represented Lithuania again at London 2012, finishing in 27th place.

Biography
At the same event (1500 m) in 2000 World Junior Championships in Athletics she finished fifth in 4:21.58.

She ran 4:13.33 at 2001 European Athletics U23 Championships – Women's 1500 metres to place 5th.

She also competed in 1500 metres running at the 2002 European Championships in Athletics without reaching final.

She was banned from competition from August 2003 to 2005 after having a positive in-competition drug test for the banned steroid Stanozolol.

On her return, she won the 2006 Vilnius Half Marathon and in 2009 she ran a course record time to win at the Tallinn Half Marathon.

She also competed indoors over 1500 m at the 2007 European Athletics Indoor Championships, although she did not get past the heats stage running a time of 4:23.38.

She ran 1:15:00 at Athletics at the 2009 Summer Universiade – Women's half marathon to place 5th.

At the 2010 European Athletics Championships she ran for Lithuania in the women's marathon and placed 15th. She set a race record at the Athens Classic Marathon in October 2010, completing the race in a time of 2:31:06 to win the race and also the World Military Championship race.

Drazdauskaitė ran at the 2011 Turin Marathon and was the runner-up behind Yuliya Ruban in a personal best time of 2:29:47 hours.

She finished in 27th place at the 2012 Summer Olympics after running a new personal best.

Drazdauskaitė ran 2:31:23 at 2015 World Championships in Athletics – Women's marathon to place 11th.

Drazdauskaitė ran 1:11:47 at 2016 European Athletics Championships – Women's half marathon to place 4th.

Drazdauskaitė ran 2:35:50 at Athletics at the 2016 Summer Olympics – Women's marathon to place 37th.

Personal bests

See also
List of doping cases in athletics

References

External links

1981 births
Living people
Lithuanian female long-distance runners
Lithuanian female marathon runners
Athletes (track and field) at the 2008 Summer Olympics
Athletes (track and field) at the 2012 Summer Olympics
Athletes (track and field) at the 2016 Summer Olympics
Olympic athletes of Lithuania
Sportspeople from Šiauliai
Doping cases in athletics
Lithuanian sportspeople in doping cases
World Athletics Championships athletes for Lithuania